Gobioclinus filamentosus, the Quillfin blenny, is a species of labrisomid blenny native to the Caribbean Sea where they can be found on reefs with substantial algal growth. This species can reach a length of  TL.

References

filamentosus
Fish of the Caribbean
Fish described in 1960
Taxa named by Victor G. Springer